Canariellanum is a genus of European dwarf spiders that was first described by J. Wunderlich in 1987.

Species
 it contains four species, all found in Canary Islands:
Canariellanum albidum Wunderlich, 1987 – Canary Is.
Canariellanum arborense Wunderlich, 1987 (type) – Canary Is.
Canariellanum hierroense Wunderlich, 1992 – Canary Is.
Canariellanum palmense Wunderlich, 1987 – Canary Is.

See also
 List of Linyphiidae species

References

Araneomorphae genera
Linyphiidae
Spiders of the Canary Islands